The Ashgabat Monorail is a monorail line on the Olympic Village in Ashgabat, Turkmenistan. Construction started in 2012, by Turkish construction company Polimeks. It uses a 25-meter rolling stock by Intamin.

References

External links
 Ashgabat Monorail by Intamin
 Olympic Complex - Polimeks

Buildings and structures in Ashgabat
Alweg people movers
Railway lines opened in 2016
Transport in Ashgabat
2016 establishments in Turkmenistan